The Venezuela men's national water polo team is the representative for Venezuela in international men's water polo.

The team won the bronze medal at the 2018 South American Games.

References

Water polo
Men's national water polo teams
National water polo teams in South America
National water polo teams by country
Men's sport in Venezuela